Holy Trinity Church is in the village of Rainow, Cheshire, England.  It is an active Anglican parish church in the deanery of Macclesfield, the archdeaconry of Macclesfield, and the diocese of Chester.  Its benefice is combined with those of St John, Saltersford, and St Stephen, Forest.  The church is recorded in the National Heritage List for England as a designated Grade II listed building.  It was a Commissioners' church, having received a grant towards its construction from the Church Building Commission.

History

Holy Trinity was built in 1845–46, the architect being Samuel Howard of Disley, and the builder John Mellor of Rainow.  A grant of £400 was given towards its construction by the Church Building Commission.

Today there are weekly services on Sunday mornings at 10am, including Holy Communion and Family Services. There is also a monthly Celtic-style Eucharist at 6.30pm on the second Sunday of the month, as well as monthly mid-week Holy Communion on the first Thursday of the month at 11.30am. This is followed by a Bring and Share lunch. Special services happen regularly throughout the year as well as lots of community groups and events, including the annual Rainow Church Fete and Scarecrow Fortnight in July.

Architecture

The church is constructed in buff sandstone.  It is roofed in Welsh slates, and has a stone ridge.  The plan consists of a broad four-bay nave, a short chancel, and a west tower.  The tower is embraced by low towers carrying the stairs to the gallery.  The tower is in three stages with angle buttresses. In the bottom stage is a west door, over which is a window containing Y-tracery.  The middle stage contains circular clock faces, and the top stage has three-light louvred bell openings.  At the summit is an embattled parapet with corner pinnacles.  Along the sides of the church the bays are divided by buttresses, each bay continuing a two-light lancet window with Y-tracery.  At each corner of the church is a pinnacle.  The east window has three lights with intersecting tracery.

Inside the church is a west gallery carried on octagonal iron posts.  There is a wide central aisle flanked by box pews.  In the gallery is a small two-manual organ, its date and maker being unknown.

See also

Listed buildings in Rainow

References

Church of England church buildings in Cheshire
Grade II listed churches in Cheshire
Churches completed in 1846
Gothic Revival church buildings in England
Gothic Revival architecture in Cheshire
Diocese of Chester
Commissioners' church buildings